Joseph Estévez (born February 13, 1946) is an American actor and director. He is the younger brother of actor Martin Sheen and the uncle of Emilio Estevez, Charlie Sheen, Renée Estevez, and Ramon Estevez.

Life and career

Early life
Estevez was born in Dayton, Ohio to a Catholic, Galician (Spanish) father, Francisco Estévez (1898–1974), and an Irish mother, Mary Anne (née Phelan) (1903–1951). He is one of ten children—nine boys and one girl.

As a child, he lived in the South Park neighborhood of Dayton. He attended Chaminade-Julienne High School, a Catholic High School located in Dayton. Upon his graduation, he enlisted and served in the United States Navy.

Career
After serving in the United States Navy, Estevez began pursuing an acting career starting in the early 1970s. He initially used his mother's maiden name, Phelan, before using his surname, Estevez. Throughout his career, Estevez has appeared in numerous film and television roles in lead, supporting, and minor parts playing protagonists and antagonists, and he frequently appears in moderate and low-budget independent features and B-movies. In addition, he has worked as a voice-over artist and performs in stage productions. He has expressed in an interview that he wants to make movies that make a difference.

Estevez stood in for his brother in a number of long shots and in some of the voice-overs for Apocalypse Now (1979), as Martin Sheen was recovering from his heart attack.

In 1992, he acted in Armed for Action and Blood on the Badge.

He plays a villain, Cyrus, in the film Doonby (2012), which features former The Dukes of Hazzard star John Schneider as a mysterious stranger who comes into a small town and falls in love with the spoiled daughter of Estevez's character, the local doctor. He also co-stars with David Faustino in the feature Not Another B Movie (2011) released by Troma Entertainment.

Estevez has recently worked with alternative-comedians Tim Heidecker and Gregg Turkington on various projects including On Cinema, The Tim Heidecker Murder Trial and as President Jason Davidson (and President Davidson Jr.) on the Adult Swim series Decker. In all his collaborations, Estevez either plays a fictionalized version of himself or a character being portrayed by a fictionalized version of Joe Estevez.

Personal life

Joe Estevez is the youngest sibling of Martin Sheen and sounds very similar to him, a fact he took advantage of when he performed a voice-over for a National Shooting Sports Foundation pro-gunmaker commercial in 2000; at the time, his brother was famous for playing a President of the United States on the television series The West Wing. Sheen starred in a pro-gun control commercial that same year. Estevez also recorded the voiceover for his brother's role as Captain Willard in Apocalypse Now after Sheen's health issues on set prevented him from doing so.

Selected filmography

References

External links
 
 

1946 births
Living people
American film producers
American male film actors
American male television actors
American people of Irish descent
American people of Spanish descent
Hispanic and Latino American male actors
Estevez family
Film directors from Ohio
Male actors from Dayton, Ohio
United States Navy sailors
20th-century American male actors
21st-century American male actors
American male voice actors